John 20:2 is the second verse of the twentieth chapter of the Gospel of John in the New Testament. Mary Magdalene has just discovered that the tomb of Jesus has been opened.  In this verse she seeks out and tells this news to Peter and the "disciple whom Jesus loved".

Content
The English Standard Version translates the passage as:

Analysis
John probably refers to the angel's message in  when he has Mary inform Peter and the other disciple. Rudolf Schnackenberg notes that the double-barreled name Simon Peter is how the Gospel of John usually refers to Peter.

The introduction of the Beloved Disciple leads to two starkly different views on the veracity of the passage and those that come later. To those who believe in the traditional view that the Beloved Disciple is the author of the Gospel it adds great weight to what comes next as it is the report of an eyewitness.

Mary Magdalene refers to they, but does not make clear who they are. Brooke Foss Westcott lists three possibilities: She might mean grave robbers. Grave robbery was a problem in Palestine during this era, as a Roman first century edict condemning the practice makes clear. They could also refer to the Jewish leaders who may have had a reason to take the body. Some feel the "we don't know where they have put him" makes it possible that they refers to the grave keepers and that Jesus' body was merely shifted to another tomb. Raymond E. Brown notes that the verb tithenai, which is translated as laid/put can also mean buried. However, if Mary was thinking the body had merely been shifted by workers it raises the question of why she is so concerned, and why Peter and the Beloved Disciple so quickly leave to investigate.

Jesus was called by Mary as lord, a title that previously had not been used by Jesus' followers in John. Some, such as Brown, see this as evidence that this section was written by a different author from the rest of the gospel. An alternative theory is that the new title is permissible now that Jesus is dead.

Mary thinks that grave-robbers or the authorities have stolen the body, whereas  mentions the allegation by the Jews that the disciples stole the body. 

Mary states that "we don't know where they have put him." However the previous verse only mentioned her at the tomb. Many scholars link this to the synoptic gospels where Mary is described as going to the grave with a group of other women. To those who believe in the inerrancy of the Bible this is evidence that the other women were in fact with Mary, but the author of John did not feel it was necessary to mention them. Some early versions of the gospel have "I" instead of "we", but Brown does not think it means much as the rest of the passage remains unaltered.

References

Sources

Further reading
 Barrett, C.K. The Gospel According to John, 2nd Edition. London:SPCK, 1978.
 Bruce, F.F. The Gospel According to John. Grand Rapids: William B. Eerdmans Publishing Company, 1983.
 Leonard, W. "St. John." A Catholic Commentary on the Bible. B. Orchard ed. New York: Thomas Nelson & Sons, 1953.
 Wesley, John.  The Wesleyan Bible Commentary. Ralph Earle ed. Grand Rapids: William B. Eerdmans Publishing Company, 1964.

External links
 John Calvin's commentary on John 20:1-9
 Commentary on John
 A comparison of different translations

20:02
Mary Magdalene